A bellcote, bell-cote or bell-cot is a small framework and shelter for one or more bells.  Bellcotes are most common in church architecture but are also seen on institutions such as schools. The bellcote may be carried on brackets projecting from a wall or built on the roof of chapels or churches that have no towers. The bellcote often holds the Sanctus bell that is rung at the consecration of the Eucharist.

The bellcote is mentioned throughout history books when referring to older structures and communities. Bromsgrove church: its history and antiquities is one example which goes into depth about the construction and maintenance of the bellcote.  Bellcotes are also discussed in The Wiltshire Archæological and Natural History Magazine, Volume 8 and Proceedings of the Somersetshire Archaeological and Natural ..., Volume 29.

Etymology 
Bellcote is a compound noun of the words bell and cot or cote.  Bell is self-explanatory. The word cot or cote is Old English, from the Germanic. It means a shelter of some kind, especially for birds or animals (see dovecote), a shed, or stall.

References

Church architecture